Wright Middle School may refer to:

 Wilbur Wright Middle School - Munster, Indiana
 Sophie B. Wright Charter School, formerly Sophie B. Wright Middle School, New Orleans, Louisiana
 Wilbur Wright Middle School (Ohio), Dayton, Ohio